The Adriatic blenny, Microlipophrys adriaticus, is a species of combtooth blenny widespread in the Mediterranean Sea, the Adriatic Sea and the Aegean Sea, also known from the Sea of Marmara and the Black Sea. This species grows to a length of  TL.

References

Adriatic blenny
Fish of the Adriatic Sea
Fish of the Black Sea
Aegean Sea
Adriatic blenny
Taxa named by Franz Steindachner
Taxa named by Juraj Kolombatović